Natalie Powell (born 16 October 1990) is a Welsh judoka. She competed for Wales in the  event at the 2014 Commonwealth Games where she won a gold medal.

Judo career
Powell is a four times champion of Great Britain, winning the half-heavyweight division at the British Judo Championships in 2012, 2013, 2014 and 2016.

In 2017, she became the first female British judoka to be ranked number one in the world, which she accomplished by winning a gold medal at the Abu Dhabi judo Grand Slam 2017. Earlier that year she won a bronze medal at the European Championships. In May 2019, Powell was selected to compete at the 2019 European Games in Minsk, Belarus.

In 2021, she competed in the women's 78 kg event at the 2020 Summer Olympics in Tokyo, Japan.

Personal life
She is openly lesbian and she is in a relationship with Sanne van Dijke from 2018.

References

External links
 
 
 
 
 

1990 births
Living people
Welsh female judoka
Judoka at the 2014 Commonwealth Games
Commonwealth Games gold medallists for Wales
Judoka at the 2016 Summer Olympics
Olympic judoka of Great Britain
Commonwealth Games medallists in judo
Sportspeople from Merthyr Tydfil
European Games competitors for Great Britain
Judoka at the 2015 European Games
Judoka at the 2019 European Games
Lesbian sportswomen
LGBT judoka
Welsh LGBT sportspeople
Welsh lesbians
Judoka at the 2020 Summer Olympics
Medallists at the 2014 Commonwealth Games